The Sex of the Stars is a 1993 Canadian drama film directed by Paule Baillargeon and written by Monique Proulx. The film was selected as the Canadian entry for the Best Foreign Language Film at the 66th Academy Awards, but was not accepted as a nominee.

Plot
Thirteen-year-old Camille (Mercier) is reunited with her long-lost father and has to come to terms with the fact that he is now a woman.

Cast
 Marianne Coquelicot Mercier as Camille
 Denis Mercier as Marie-Pierre
 Tobie Pelletier as Lucky
 Sylvie Drapeau as Michele
 Luc Picard as J. Boulet
 Gilles Renaud as Jacob
 Jean-René Ouellet as Le dragueur

See also
 List of submissions to the 66th Academy Awards for Best Foreign Language Film
 List of Canadian submissions for the Academy Award for Best Foreign Language Film
 List of LGBT films directed by women

References

External links
 
 

1993 films
Quebec films
Canadian drama films
Canadian LGBT-related films
1993 drama films
LGBT-related drama films
1993 LGBT-related films
Films about trans women
French-language Canadian films
1990s Canadian films